The Washington School is a historic school building at 8 School Street in Weymouth, Massachusetts.  The -story wood-frame building was designed by Shepard S. Woodcock and built in 1887.  The six-room building has characteristic Queen Anne styling, including asymmetrical massing, varied gable treatments, use of decorative fish-scale shingles, and an elaborately decorated entry porch.

The building was listed on the National Register of Historic Places in 1986.  It has since been converted into offices.

See also
National Register of Historic Places listings in Norfolk County, Massachusetts

References

School buildings on the National Register of Historic Places in Massachusetts
Weymouth, Massachusetts
National Register of Historic Places in Norfolk County, Massachusetts